Mick Moody (born 24 February 1960) was an Irish soccer player during the 1980s and 1990s.

Career
Moody was a tough defender who began his career in 1979 at Shelbourne. After a couple of years at Tolka Park, he moved to Bray Wanderers who were then a Leinster Senior League side.

In 1984, he returned to the League of Ireland and joined Home Farm where he spent 2 seasons, alongside future teammates Dave Henderson and Pat Kelch. After a year in the First Division with Drogheda United, he moved to St Patricks Athletic and would have the most successful spell of his career.

Pat's finished as runners up in 1987/88, came in third spot the following season (Mick was voted the club's Player of the Year in both seasons) before clinching the Premier Division league title in 1989/90. Due to financial problems in Inchicore, that Pat's team would soon break up and in 1992, Moody signed for Shamrock Rovers. Despite Noel King being sacked in Mick's first season at Rovers, he would make 52 league appearances (2 goals) in his 2 years at the "Hoops".

Eamonn Gregg took him to Dalymount Park in the summer of 1993 and he would go on to make 68 league appearances, scoring 2 goals at Bohemians during his 3 years at the club. He returned to St Patrick's Athletic following his time at Bohs.

Off the field
Mick was a member of the Garda Síochána and made the headlines in August 1989 when he arrested U2 member Adam Clayton.

Honours
League of Ireland: 1
 St Patricks Athletic - 1989/90

References 

1960 births
Living people
Association footballers from County Wicklow
Republic of Ireland association footballers
League of Ireland players
Home Farm F.C. players
Drogheda United F.C. players
St Patrick's Athletic F.C. players
Shamrock Rovers F.C. players
Bohemian F.C. players
Shelbourne F.C. players
Leinster Senior League (association football) players
Association football defenders
Bray Wanderers F.C. players